This is a list including all rulers who had carried the title of emperor or who ruled over an empire through history.

Emperors of traditional empires

Asia

Europe

Americas

Africa

Emperors of short-lived monarchies 
Emperor Jacques of the Empire of Haiti (1804–1806)
Emperor Augustine of the First Mexican Empire (1822–1823)
Emperor Faustin of the Empire of Haiti (1849–1859)
Emperor Maximilian of the Second Mexican Empire (1864–1867)
Emperor Sunjong and Gojong of the Korean Empire (1897–1910)
The Hongxian Emperor of the Empire of China (1915–1916)
The Datong Emperor of the Empire of Manchuria (1934–1945)
Emperor Bảo Đại of the Empire of Vietnam (1945)
Emperor Bokassa of the Central African Empire (1976–1979)

Self-proclaimed "emperors" 
See also Self-proclaimed monarchy and micronation

Simeon Uroš, "Emperor of Serbs and Greeks" (held by Uroš V), in reality Despot of Epirus and Thessaly (1359–1369)
John Uroš, "Emperor of Serbs and Greeks", in reality Despot of Thessaly (1369–1373)
Jovan Nenad, "Emperor of Serbs" (1526–1527)
Andrés Novales, “Emperor of the Philippines” (1823)
Joshua Abraham Norton, “Emperor of the United States of America” (1859-1880)

Fictional emperors
Category: Fictional emperors and empresses

Emperors